Wave system can refer to:
Bose Wave System
Bose Acoustic Wave System (AM/FM/CD/AUX/Boselink)
Bose Wave Radio (AM/FM/AUX/BoseLink)
Bose Wave Music System (AM/FM/CD/AUX/Boselink)

See also
D-Wave Systems
The Wave Transit System